Suyindik (Süiındık, سۇيىندىك; , Suyunduk) is a town in Atyrau Region, west Kazakhstan.

References

Atyrau Region
Cities and towns in Kazakhstan